The Certified Computer Examiner (CCE) credential demonstrates competency in computer forensics. The CCE is offered by the International Society for Computer Examiners (ISFCE), an organization that hopes to create and maintain high standards for computer examiners worldwide.

Qualifications
Candidates for the CCE must have no criminal record and adhere to the ISFCE code of ethics. They should have at least 18 months of professional experience or documented training, and pass an online examination. As well as the online examination, candidates must perform a forensic examination on at least three "test media".

Once candidates have successfully completed the requirements of the ISFCE, they are considered Certified Computer Examiners and members of the ISFCE.

To maintain the credential of Certified Computer Examiner, fifty hours of education or training must be completed every two years. In addition, candidates must work on at least three media during that period. An online examination is also required every two years for recertification.

External links

Computer forensics